Eduard Gabriel Rădăslăvescu (born 30 July 2004) is a Romanian professional footballer who plays as an attacking midfielder for Liga I club FCSB.

Club career
Rădăslăvescu made his Liga I debut for Farul Constanța on 17 October 2021, in a 1–2 away loss to Argeș Pitești. On 9 April 2022, he scored the first goal of his senior career in a 2–0 Liga I win against the same opponent.

On 5 August 2022, Rădăslăvescu was transferred to fellow Liga I team FCSB.

Career statistics

Club

References

External links
 
 
 

2004 births
Living people
People from Orșova
Romanian footballers
Association football midfielders
Liga I players
FC Viitorul Constanța players
FCV Farul Constanța players
FC Steaua București players
Romania youth international footballers